Lettering is an umbrella term that covers the art of drawing letters, instead of simply writing them. Lettering is considered an art form, where each letter in a phrase or quote acts as an illustration. Each letter is created with attention to detail and has a unique role within a composition. Lettering is created as an image, with letters that are meant to be used in a unique configuration. Lettering words do not always translate into alphabets that can later be used in a typeface, since they are created with a specific word in mind.

Examples

Lettering includes that used for purposes of blueprints and comic books, as well as decorative lettering such as sign painting and custom graphics. For instance; on posters, for a letterhead or business wordmark, lettering in stone, lettering for advertisements, tire lettering, fileteado, graffiti, or on chalkboards.

Lettering may be drawn, incised, applied using stencils, using a digital medium with a stylus, or a vector program. Lettering that was not created using digital tools is commonly referred to as hand-lettering.

In the past, almost all decorative lettering other than that on paper was created as custom or hand-painted lettering. The use of fonts in place of lettering has increased due to new printing methods, phototypesetting, and digital typesetting, which allow fonts to be printed at any desired size. Lettering has been particularly important in Islamic art, due to the Islamic practice of avoiding depictions of sentient beings generally and of Muhammad in particular, and instead using representations in the form of Islamic calligraphy, including hilyes, or artforms based on written descriptions of Muhammed.

More recently, there has been an influx of aspiring artists attempting hand-lettering with brush pens and digital mediums. Some popular styles are sans serif, serif, cursive/script, vintage, blackletter ("gothic") calligraphy, graffiti, and creative lettering.

Related artforms 

Lettering can be confused with similar terms, such as calligraphy or typography. 

Calligraphy is known as a more rigid process, that requires learning the formal shapes of letters and often combining thick downstrokes with thin upstrokes. This style of writing is generally created with dip pens and inks. Some calligraphers and hand-letterers say that calligraphy created with brush pens becomes lettering or faux-calligraphy, but others believe that the approach used to create the letters is more important than the tools used to do so.

Typography is referred to as the use of type in a repeating system, where each instance of the same letter looks the same.

Part of the reason why these misconceptions are common is that some font shops categorize their fonts as "hand-lettered", "illustrated" or "calligraphy". Said fonts can begin with a hand-lettered alphabet that is then digitized and turned into a repeatable system. This identifies them as typography, instead of lettering.

Hand Lettering for Beginners defines the three terms as follows: Lettering is the art of drawing letters, calligraphy is the art of writing letters, and typography is the art of using letters.

See also
 Typeface anatomy, the graphic elements that make up letters in a typeface

References

External links
Many textbooks on lettering or books of example alphabets were published in the nineteenth and early twentieth centuries. Those linked below are free to read at archive.org.
 
 
 
  (sampler)

Typography
Signage
Calligraphy